Ivory Coast competed at the 2012 Summer Olympics in London, United Kingdom  from 27 July to 12 August 2012. This was the nation's thirteenth appearance at the Olympics.

The Ivory Coast National Olympic Committee sent a total of 10 athletes to the Games, 4 men and 6 women, to compete in 6 sports. For the third time in its history, Ivory Coast was represented by more female than male athletes at an Olympic event. Sprinter Ben Youssef Meité was the nation's first male flag bearer at the opening ceremony since 2000. Among the sports played by the athletes, Ivory Coast also marked its Olympic debut in archery.

Ivory Coast, however, failed to win a single Olympic medal in London. Sprinter and Olympic hopeful Murielle Ahouré qualified successfully for the final rounds in two of her events, but missed out of the nation's first medal since 1984, after finishing farther from the standings.

Archery

Ivory Coast qualified one archer.

Athletics

Ivorian athletes have so far achieved qualifying standards in the following athletics events (up to a maximum of 3 athletes in each event at the 'A' Standard, and 1 at the 'B' Standard):

 Key
 Note – Ranks given for track events are within the athlete's heat only
 Q = Qualified for the next round
 q = Qualified for the next round as a fastest loser or, in field events, by position without achieving the qualifying target
 NR = National record
 N/A = Round not applicable for the event
 Bye = Athlete not required to compete in round

Men

Women

Judo

Swimming

Ivory Coast has gained two "Universality places" from the FINA.

Men

Women

Taekwondo

Ivory Coast qualified 1 athlete.

Wrestling

Ivory Coast qualified in the following events.

 Key
  – Victory by Fall.
  - Decision by Points - the loser with technical points.
  - Decision by Points - the loser without technical points.

Women's freestyle

References

External links
 
 

Nations at the 2012 Summer Olympics
2012
2012 in Ivorian sport